Olepa toulgoeti is a moth of the family Erebidae first described by Orhant in 1986. It is found in southern India.

References

Spilosomina
Moths described in 1986